Clark–Pratt House is a historic home located at Kenton, Kent County, Delaware, USA. The house was built about 1880 and is a two-story, five bay, center hall frame dwelling in a combined Italianate / Gothic Revival style. It is sided in weatherboard and has a gable roof with cross-gable. Also on the property are a contributing summer kitchen, privy and small barn/carriage house.

It was listed on the National Register of Historic Places in 1983.

References

Houses on the National Register of Historic Places in Delaware
Gothic Revival architecture in Delaware
Italianate architecture in Delaware
Houses completed in 1880
Houses in Kent County, Delaware
Kenton, Delaware
National Register of Historic Places in Kent County, Delaware